James Thompson was a leading early cartographer. He produced one of the first maps of York – his Plan of the City of York and Ainsty (1785), which was based on the work of Francis White.

Publications
1785  Plan of the City of York and Ainsty, based on the work of Francis White. This is a coloured etching, size 664x860mm, and is currently located in York City Art Gallery and is part of the Evelyn Collection.

See also
 A chart of the North Sea, from the Forelands to North Bergen, and from the Scaw to the Orkneys and Shetland. Shewing the harbours, havens, bays and roads, banks, rocks, shoals, depths of water, &ca. with the most remarkable appearances of land. Done from various surveys, of the British, Dutch, and Danish pilots by James Thompson, Mariner, 1777. Publ. Robert Sayer 

Year of birth missing
Year of death missing
British cartographers
18th-century British people